Events from the year 1546 in Sweden

Incumbents
 Monarch – Gustav I

Events

 - The city of Linköping burns down. 
 - Ekenäs is granted city privileges.

Births

Deaths

References

 
Years of the 16th century in Sweden
Sweden